Lehmannia is a genus of air-breathing land slugs in the family Limacidae, the keelback slugs. The genus is distributed in Europe and North Africa.

Description
These are narrow-bodied slugs up to 8 centimeters long. The mantle covers less than a third of the body length. They are cream-colored to brown or black, usually with at least two longitudinal stripes along the mantle. The sole of the foot is lightest in the middle. The penis is short compared to those of Limax, and in shape it may be "tubular, baggy, or claviform" (club-shaped). The mucus is watery.

Biology
Many species live in mountain habitat, where they can be found on trees and rocks and feed on lichens. Other species (in particular those placed by some authorities in the genus Ambigolimax) are synanthropic and invasive.

Species 
There are about 18 species in the genus. Currently (2022) authorities disagree whether to split off some species into the genus Ambigolimax, as some phylogenies based on DNA sequences suggest is appropriate. The following list defines Lehmannia in the broad sense (sensu lato), but indicates which species have been placed in Ambigolimax:

 Lehmannia brunneri (H. Wagner, 1931)
 Lehmannia horezia Grossu & Lupu, 1962
 Lehmannia carpatica Hutchinson, Reise & Schlitt, 2022
 Lehmannia islandica Forcart, 1966
 Lehmannia janetscheki Forcart, 1966
 Lehmannia jaroslaviae Grossu, 1967
 Lehmannia macroflagellata Grossu et Lupu, 1962
 Lehmannia marginata (O.F. Müller, 1774) – tree slug (type species)
 Lehmannia medioflagellata Lupu, 1968
 Lehmannia melitensis (Lessona & Pollonera, 1882) = Ambigolimax melitensis according to 
 Lehmannia parvipenis = Ambigolimax parvipenis Hutchinson, Reise & Schlitt, 2022
 Lehmannia requienii Pollonera, 1896
 Lehmannia rupicola Lessona & Pollonera, 1882
 Lehmannia sarmizegetusae Grossu, 1970
 Lehmannia szigethyae Wiktor, 1975
 Lehmannia valentiana (Férussac, 1822) = Ambigolimax valentianus – Valencia slug, threeband garden slug 
 Lehmannia vrancensis Lupu, 1973
 Lehmannia waterstoni = Ambigolimax waterstoni Hutchinson, Reise & Schlitt, 2022

Note that the name Lehmannia nyctelia (= Ambigolimax nyctelius) is no longer valid. The species originally given the species name is in the genus Letourneuxia, but the name has been mistakenly applied to three of the species listed above (L. carpatica, A. parvipenis and A. waterstoni).

References

External links 

Limacidae